This was a Scottish non-league football (soccer) competition that ran at various times between 1891 and 1946.

Eastern Alliance

1891–92 
The Eastern Football Alliance was formed in 1891–92 by predominantly six Linlithgowshire clubs; Mossend Swifts, Armadale, Bathgate Rovers, Bo'ness, Broxburn, and Leith Hibernian (a club related to the original Hibernian).

Kircaldy were later admitted to the league, but withdrew during the season and their results expunged. Leith Hibernian were dissolved before the tournament started, and were replaced by Adventurers.

The league remained unfinished and was wound before the season finished.

East of Scotland League

1893–94 
The first East of Scotland Football League was  formed in 1893–94 by six West Lothian clubs. The league was officially formed and its officials were selected at the East of Scotland FA Rooms in January 1894.

Broxburn Shamrock were to join after the first season. The competition was poorly received. It wad unfinished primarily because it had started so late in the season.

Eastern League

1904–07 

After an unsuccessful season of the revived Midland League, the Eastern Football League was reformed by nine clubs on August 6, 1904. One of those clubs, Hearts of Beath was later replaced with Hearts 'A'.

After a single season, member clubs Bo'ness, Broxburn, and Broxburn Shamrock all left to join the reformed Scottish Alliance. An ailing league only lasted another season before it was disbanded.

Champions 

1904–05 Heart of Midlothian 'A'

1905–06 Heart of Midlothian 'A'

1906–07 unfinished

Membership 

Adventurers 1904–1906
Bathgate 1904–1905
Berwick Rangers 1905–1907
Bo'ness 1904–1905
Broxburn 1904–1905
Broxburn Athletic 1905–1907
Broxburn Shamrock 1904–1905, 1906–1907
Cowdenbeath 'A' 1905–1906
Dykehead 1904–1905
East Fife 1904–1905
Heart of Midlothian 'A' 1904–1907
West Calder Swifts 1904–1905
West Lothian Albion 1906–1907

1912–14 

The Eastern Football League was revived in 1912–13 and lasted for two seasons.

It came about after the Northern League had lost several of its principal clubs to other leagues, and there was a failed attempt to re-form as the North Eastern League with clubs from the Lothians and Borders.

Membership 

Broxburn Shamrock 1912–14
Clackmannan 1912–14
Dumfermline Athletic 'A' 1913–14
Gala Fairydean 1912–14
Hearts of Beath 1912–13
Lochgelly 1912–14
Musselburgh 1912–13
Peebles Rovers 1912–14
Selkirk 1912–14
Vale of Leithen 1912–14
West Calder Swifts 1912–13

1915–18

In 1915, the Scottish League suspended its Division Two for the remainder of World War I. The member clubs combined with multiple non-league sides formed two regional leagues - Western and  Eastern Football Leagues.

Although the Western League continued throughout the World War II, the Eastern League went in to abeyance after season 1917–18 due to the lack of clubs still operating in the area.

Champions

1915–16 Armadale

1916–17 Cowdenbeath

1917–18 Cowdenbeath

Membership

Armdale 1915–1918
Bathgate 1915–1917
Broxburn United 1915–1917
Cowdenbeath 1915–1918
Dundee 1917–1918
Dundee Hibernian 1915–1918
Dunfermline Athletic 1915–1918
East Fife 1915–1918
East Stirlingshire 1915–1917
Kirkcaldy United 1915–1916
Leith Athletic 1915–1916
Lochgelly United 1915–1918
Raith Rovers 1917–1918
St Bernard's 1915–1917

1919–23

Champions

1919–20 Dundee Hibernian

1920–21

1921–22

1922–23

Membership

Aberdeen 'A' 1922–1923
Arbroath 1919–1920
Arbroath Athletic 1922–1923
Brechin City 1919–1923
Clackmannan 1922–1923
Cowdenbeath 1919–1920
Dundee 'A' 1919–1920, 1922–1923
Dundee Hibernian 1919–1920, 1922–1923
Forfar Athletic 1919–1920
leith Athletic 1922–1923
Lochgelly United 1919–1920
Montrose 1919–1923
Peebles Rovers 1921–1922
Raith Rovers 'A' 1919–1920
St Johnstone 1919–1920

See also
 East of Scotland League 
 (supplementary competition, 1894–1907)
 East of Scotland League
 (level 6–9 on pyramid, founded 1923)
 Scottish Football (Defunct Leagues)

References 

Defunct football leagues in Scotland